Dustin Hopkins (born October 1, 1990) is an American football placekicker for the Los Angeles Chargers of the National Football League (NFL). He played college football at Florida State and was drafted by the Buffalo Bills in the sixth round of the 2013 NFL Draft. Hopkins was a member of Washington Redskins / Football Team from 2015 until being released in 2021.

College career
Hopkins was recruited by Florida State when then Seminoles special teams coordinator Jody Allen watched high school game film of Hopkins's kickoffs. Interest was also shown by Notre Dame. As a freshman in 2009, Hopkins hit 19 of 27 field goals, or approximately 70%, over the course of 2009. On November 13, 2010, against Clemson, Florida State, who was trailing the entire game, made a comeback in the 4th quarter. With less than a minute left in regulation, tied at 13, Florida State marched down into Clemson territory, where, with 3 seconds left, Hopkins made a 55-yard field goal to win the game. 

In 2011, while playing against Wake Forest, Hopkins kicked his 109th point after touchdown (PAT) in a row, breaking the previous FSU record. He would not miss a PAT until September 8, 2012, leaving him at 145 successful attempts, the sixth longest streak in NCAA history. On November 18, 2012, Hopkins set the NCAA Division I FBS record for career points scored by a kicker at 442 points with a 26-yard field goal in the second quarter versus the Maryland Terrapins. Hopkins would finish the day with six more points upping the record to 448 points. His record for most career field goals was later broken in 2016 by Arizona State University kicker Zane Gonzalez.

Professional career

Buffalo Bills
Hopkins was drafted by the Buffalo Bills in the sixth round with the 177th overall pick in the 2013 NFL Draft, joining punter Shawn Powell and quarterback EJ Manuel, his former teammates at Florida State.

On May 10, 2013, Hopkins signed a four-year contract with the Buffalo Bills.

On August 19, 2013, Hopkins was named the starting placekicker over veteran Rian Lindell. On September 2, 2013, Hopkins was revealed to have sustained a groin injury. This prompted the Bills to sign Dan Carpenter. Due to a slow recovery from that injury and the need to further open roster spots, Hopkins was placed on injured reserve following Week 5.

Hopkins was given a chance to earn back his roster spot during the 2014 season, but lost the kicking competition to Carpenter; the Bills released Hopkins on August 25, 2014.

New Orleans Saints
Hopkins was signed to the New Orleans Saints practice squad on December 17, 2014. He was then signed to a future/reserve contract at the end of the 2014 season and competed for placekicking duties with Shayne Graham.

On September 5, 2015, the Saints announced they had released Hopkins after losing the competition to Zach Hocker.

Washington Redskins / Football Team

Hopkins was signed by the Washington Redskins on September 14, 2015, after they had released Kai Forbath. On October 14, 2018, Hopkins kicked a career-long 56-yard field goal against the Carolina Panthers. On November 15, 2015, Hopkins kicked a career-high four field goals against the New Orleans Saints. On October 30, 2016, Hopkins missed a potential game winner in the late stages of overtime which would eventually end in a 27-27 tie against the Cincinnati Bengals.  During the 2016 season, Hopkins set a franchise record with 34 field goals made. On October 15, 2017, Hopkins suffered a partially torn hip muscle during a game against the San Francisco 49ers, and was placed on injured reserve days later. He was activated back to the 53-man roster on December 16, 2017.

On March 12, 2018, Hopkins signed a three-year contract extension with the Redskins. On the 2018 season, Hopkins converted 25 of 26 extra point attempts and 26 of 29 field goal attempts. In the 2019 season, Hopkins converted 21 of 22 extra point attempts and 25 of 30 field goal attempts.

In Week 6 of the 2020 season, Hopkins missed a 47-yard field goal attempt against the New York Giants. The Giants would win the game with the final score at 19-20 with Head Coach Ron Rivera choosing a two-point attempt instead of sending Hopkins to attempt the extra point and potentially bringing the game to overtime. The next week, Hopkins would miss  a 44-yard field goal in the win over the Dallas Cowboys. In the Week 10 loss to the Detroit Lions, Hopkins missed another field goal attempt at 43 yards with the final score of the game at 27-30. After the game when asked if he was considering bringing in another kicker, Head Coach Ron Rivera stated “Well, it is something that we are talking about and discussing.”

In Week 13 against the Pittsburgh Steelers, Hopkins was a perfect 3 for 3 on his field goal attempts and 2 for 2 on his extra point attempts during the 23–17 win. This was the Steelers’ first loss of the season. Hopkins was named the NFC Special Teams Player of the Week for his performance in Week 13. He re-signed with the team in March 2021.

During Thursday Night Football against the New York Giants on September 16, 2021, Hopkins kicked a game-winning field goal at the climax of the game as Washington won 30–29. At first, Hopkins missed, but the Giants defense committed an offside penalty, giving Hopkins a second chance, which succeeded.

In Week 3 of the 2021 season against the Buffalo Bills, Hopkins recovered his own kickoff after the Bills failed to receive the kick, resulting in his first career fumble recovery. Hopkins was released by the team on October 20, 2021.

Los Angeles Chargers
On October 26, 2021, Hopkins signed with the Los Angeles Chargers.

On March 14, 2022, Hopkins signed a three-year contract extension with the Chargers.

In Week 6 of the 2022 NFL season on Monday Night Football against the Denver Broncos, Hopkins injured his hamstring but still went 4-4 on field goals, including the game-winner in overtime. For this performance, Hopkins was named the AFC Special Teams Player of the Week. He missed the next four games with the injury before being placed on injured reserve on November 22, 2022.

Personal life
Hopkins is a Christian. He is married to Gabrielle Hopkins. They have one son together.

References

External links

Los Angeles Chargers bio
Florida State Seminoles bio

1990 births
Living people
Players of American football from Austin, Texas
Players of American football from Houston
Clear Lake High School (Houston, Texas) alumni
American football placekickers
Florida State Seminoles football players
Buffalo Bills players
New Orleans Saints players
Washington Redskins players
Washington Football Team players
Los Angeles Chargers players